Camchaya is a genus of flowering plants in the family Asteraceae. They are native to Asia, including China, Laos, Thailand, Vietnam, and Cambodia.

These are annual herbs with coatings of hairs and globose glandular structures. The alternately arranged leaves have wavy or serrated blades on petioles. The inflorescence is a panicle which can be terminal or axillary. Some inflorescences have few flower heads, and some heads are solitary. The hemispherical head has up to 6 layers of phyllaries. It contains many purple florets which are tubular and expanded at the mouth into five pointed lobes and bear a long, branching style. The fruit is a compressed achene, usually with ten ribs, but sometimes with five. Some achenes have a pappus of up to 10 fragile bristles. The pollen of plants in the genus has a unique "6-porate echinolophate" morphology.

 Accepted species
The following list reflects species accepted by The Plant List and the Global Compositae Checklist. Some recent publications suggest moving some of these taxa to other genera (Vernonia and Iodocephalopsis).
 Camchaya eberhardtii  - Thailand, Vietnam
 Camchaya gracilis - Thailand
 Camchaya kanpotensis - Thailand, Cambodia
 Camchaya loloana - Thailand, Vietnam, Yunnan
 Camchaya pentagona - Thailand
 Camchaya spinulifera - Thailand
 Camchaya tenuiflora - Thailand
 Camchaya thailandica - Thailand

References

Asteraceae genera
Vernonieae